Perpetrator may refer to:
Someone who committed a crime
Suspect of committing a crime
Perpetrators, victims, and bystanders, a typology in genocide studies
Perpetrator studies, the academic study of perpetrators of political violence
 Perpetrator (film), a 2023 American-French co-production horror film